Benzofluorene or the molecular formula C17H12 may refer to:

 Benzo[a]fluorene, a polycyclic aromatic hydrocarbon (PAH)
 Benzo[b]fluorene
 Benzo[c]fluorene, a polycyclic aromatic hydrocarbon (PAH) with mutagenic activity